Arthur Edward Heatley (25 October 1865 – 1 July 1941) was an English cricketer.  Heatley's batting and bowling styles are unknown.  He was born at Brighton, Sussex.

Heatley made a single first-class appearance for Essex against Yorkshire at Thrum Hall, Halifax in 1894.  In this match, he scored 7 runs in Essex's first-innings before being dismissed by Thomas Foster, while in their second-innings he ended unbeaten on 13.  Yorkshire won the match by 7 wickets.

He died at Ingrave, Essex on 1 July 1941.

References

External links
Arthur Heatley at ESPNcricinfo
Arthur Heatley at CricketArchive

1865 births
1941 deaths
Sportspeople from Brighton
English cricketers
Essex cricketers